Orthomyxoviridae (from Greek ὀρθός, orthós 'straight' + μύξα, mýxa 'mucus') is a family of negative-sense RNA viruses. It includes seven genera: Alphainfluenzavirus, Betainfluenzavirus, Gammainfluenzavirus, Deltainfluenzavirus,  Isavirus, Thogotovirus, and Quaranjavirus. The first four genera contain viruses that cause influenza in birds (see also avian influenza) and mammals, including humans. Isaviruses infect salmon; the thogotoviruses are arboviruses, infecting vertebrates and invertebrates (such as ticks and mosquitoes). The Quaranjaviruses are also arboviruses, infecting vertebrates (birds) and invertebrates (arthropods).

The four genera of Influenza virus that infect vertebrates, which are identified by antigenic differences in their nucleoprotein and matrix protein, are as follows:
 Alphainfluenzavirus infects humans, other mammals, and birds, and causes all flu pandemics
 Betainfluenzavirus infects humans and seals
 Gammainfluenzavirus infects humans and pigs
 Deltainfluenzavirus infects pigs and cattle.

Structure 

The influenzavirus virion is pleomorphic; the viral envelope can occur in spherical and filamentous forms. In general, the virus's morphology is ellipsoidal with particles 100–120 nm in diameter, or filamentous with particles 80–100 nm in diameter and up to 20 µm long. There are approximately 500 distinct spike-like surface projections in the envelope each projecting 10–14 nm from the surface with varying surface densities. The major glycoprotein (HA) spike is interposed irregularly by clusters of neuraminidase (NA) spikes, with a ratio of HA to NA of about 10 to 1.

The viral envelope composed of a lipid bilayer membrane in which the glycoprotein spikes are anchored encloses the nucleocapsids; nucleoproteins of different size classes with a loop at each end; the arrangement within the virion is uncertain. The ribonuclear proteins are filamentous and fall in the range of 50–130 nm long and 9–15 nm in diameter with helical symmetry.

Genome 

Viruses of the family Orthomyxoviridae contain six to eight segments of linear negative-sense single stranded RNA. They have a total genome length that is 10,000–14,600 nucleotides (nt). The influenza A genome, for instance, has eight pieces of segmented negative-sense RNA (13.5 kilobases total).

The best-characterised of the influenzavirus proteins are hemagglutinin and neuraminidase, two large glycoproteins found on the outside of the viral particles. Hemagglutinin is a lectin that mediates binding of the virus to target cells and entry of the viral genome into the target cell. In contrast, neuraminidase is an enzyme involved in the release of progeny virus from infected cells, by cleaving sugars that bind the mature viral particles. The hemagglutinin (H) and neuraminidase (N) proteins are key targets for antibodies and antiviral drugs, and they are used to classify the different serotypes of influenza A viruses, hence the H and N in H5N1.

The genome sequence has terminal repeated sequences; repeated at both ends. Terminal repeats at the 5′-end 12–13 nucleotides long. Nucleotide sequences of 3′-terminus identical; the same in genera of same family; most on RNA (segments), or on all RNA species. Terminal repeats at the 3′-end 9–11 nucleotides long. Encapsidated nucleic acid is solely genomic. Each virion may contain defective interfering copies. In Influenza A (H1N1) PB1-F2 is produced from an alternative reading frame in PB1. The M and NS genes produce two different genes via alternative splicing.

Replication cycle 

Typically, influenza is transmitted from infected mammals through the air by coughs or sneezes, creating aerosols containing the virus, and from infected birds through their droppings. Influenza can also be transmitted by saliva, nasal secretions, feces and blood. Infections occur through contact with these bodily fluids or with contaminated surfaces. They can be inactivated easily by disinfectants and detergents.

The viruses bind to a cell through interactions between its hemagglutinin glycoprotein and sialic acid sugars on the surfaces of epithelial cells in the lung and throat (Stage 1 in infection figure). The cell imports the virus by endocytosis. In the acidic endosome, part of the hemagglutinin protein fuses the viral envelope with the vacuole's membrane, releasing the viral RNA (vRNA) molecules, accessory proteins and RNA-dependent RNA polymerase into the cytoplasm (Stage 2). These proteins and vRNA form a complex that is transported into the cell nucleus, where the RNA-dependent RNA polymerase begins transcribing complementary positive-sense cRNA (Steps 3a and b). The cRNA is either exported into the cytoplasm and translated (step 4), or remains in the nucleus. Newly synthesised viral proteins are either secreted through the Golgi apparatus onto the cell surface (in the case of neuraminidase and hemagglutinin, step 5b) or transported back into the nucleus to bind vRNA and form new viral genome particles (step 5a). Other viral proteins have multiple actions in the host cell, including degrading cellular mRNA and using the released nucleotides for vRNA synthesis and also inhibiting translation of host-cell mRNAs.

Negative-sense vRNAs that form the genomes of future viruses, RNA-dependent RNA transcriptase, and other viral proteins are assembled into a virion. Hemagglutinin and neuraminidase molecules cluster into a bulge in the cell membrane. The vRNA and viral core proteins leave the nucleus and enter this membrane protrusion (step 6). The mature virus buds off from the cell in a sphere of host phospholipid membrane, acquiring hemagglutinin and neuraminidase with this membrane coat (step 7). As before, the viruses adhere to the cell through hemagglutinin; the mature viruses detach once their neuraminidase has cleaved sialic acid residues from the host cell. After the release of new influenza virus, the host cell dies.

Orthomyxoviridae viruses are one of two RNA viruses that replicate in the nucleus (the other being retroviridae). This is because the machinery of orthomyxo viruses cannot make their own mRNAs. They use cellular RNAs as primers for initiating the viral mRNA synthesis in a process known as cap snatching. Once in the nucleus, the RNA Polymerase Protein PB2 finds a cellular pre-mRNA and binds to its 5′ capped end. Then RNA Polymerase PA cleaves off the cellular mRNA near the 5′ end and uses this capped fragment as a primer for transcribing the rest of the viral RNA genome in viral mRNA. This is due to the need of mRNA to have a 5′ cap in order to be recognized by the cell's ribosome for translation.

Since RNA proofreading enzymes are absent, the RNA-dependent RNA transcriptase makes a single nucleotide insertion error roughly every 10 thousand nucleotides, which is the approximate length of the influenza vRNA. Hence, nearly every newly manufactured influenza virus will contain a mutation in its genome. The separation of the genome into eight separate segments of vRNA allows mixing (reassortment) of the genes if more than one variety of influenza virus has infected the same cell (superinfection). The resulting alteration in the genome segments packaged into viral progeny confers new behavior, sometimes the ability to infect new host species or to overcome protective immunity of host populations to its old genome (in which case it is called an antigenic shift).

Classification 
In a phylogenetic-based taxonomy, the category RNA virus includes the subcategory negative-sense ssRNA virus, which includes the order Articulavirales, and the family Orthomyxoviridae.  The genera-associated species and serotypes of Orthomyxoviridae are shown in the following table.

Types 
There are four genera of influenza virus, each containing only a single species, or type. Influenza A and C infect a variety of species (including humans), while influenza B almost exclusively infects humans, and influenza D infects cattle and pigs.

Influenza A 

Influenza A viruses are further classified, based on the viral surface proteins hemagglutinin (HA or H) and neuraminidase (NA or N). 18 HA subtypes (or serotypes) and 11 NA subtypes of influenza A virus have been isolated in nature. Among these, the HA subtype 1-16 and NA subtype 1-9 are found in wild waterfowl and shorebirds and the HA subtypes 17-18 and NA subtypes 10-11 have only been isolated from bats.

Further variation exists; thus, specific influenza strain isolates are identified by a standard nomenclature specifying virus type, geographical location where first isolated, sequential number of isolation, year of isolation, and HA and NA subtype.

Examples of the nomenclature are:
 A/Brisbane/59/2007 (H1N1)
 A/Moscow/10/99 (H3N2).

The type A influenza viruses are the most virulent human pathogens among the three influenza types and cause the most severe disease. It is thought that all influenza A viruses causing outbreaks or pandemics originate from wild aquatic birds. All influenza A virus pandemics since the 1900's were caused by Avian influenza, through Reassortment with human influenza strains (seasonal flu) or through adaptation in a mixing vessel (see 2009 swine flu pandemic). The serotypes that have been confirmed in humans, ordered by the number of confirmed human deaths, are:
 H1N1 caused "Spanish flu" in 1918 and "Swine flu" in 2009.
 H2N2 caused "Asian Flu".
 H3N2 caused "Hong Kong Flu".
 H5N1, "avian" or "bird flu".
 H7N7 has unusual zoonotic potential.
 H1N2 infects pigs and humans.
 H9N2, H7N2, H7N3, H10N7.

Influenza B 

Influenza B virus is almost exclusively a human pathogen, and is less common than influenza A. The only other animal known to be susceptible to influenza B infection is the seal. This type of influenza mutates at a rate 2–3 times lower than type A and consequently is less genetically diverse, with only one influenza B serotype. As a result of this lack of antigenic diversity, a degree of immunity to influenza B is usually acquired at an early age. However, influenza B mutates enough that lasting immunity is not possible. This reduced rate of antigenic change, combined with its limited host range (inhibiting cross species antigenic shift), ensures that pandemics of influenza B do not occur.

Influenza C 

The influenza C virus infects humans and pigs, and can cause severe illness and local epidemics. However, influenza C is less common than the other types and usually causes mild disease in children.

Influenza D 

This is a genus that was classified in 2016, the members of which were first isolated in 2011. This genus appears to be most closely related to Influenza C, from which it diverged several hundred years ago. There are at least two extant strains of this genus. The main hosts appear to be cattle, but the virus has been known to infect pigs as well.

Viability and disinfection 
Mammalian influenza viruses tend to be labile, but can survive several hours in mucus. The avian virus is inactivated more quickly in manure, but can survive for up to 2 weeks in feces on cages. Avian influenza viruses can survive indefinitely when frozen. Influenza viruses are susceptible to bleach, 70% ethanol, aldehydes, oxidizing agents, and quaternary ammonium compounds.

Vaccination and prophylaxis 

Vaccines and drugs are available for the prophylaxis and treatment of influenza virus infections. Vaccines are composed of either inactivated or live attenuated virions of the H1N1 and H3N2 human influenza A viruses, as well as those of influenza B viruses. Because the antigenicities of the wild viruses evolve, vaccines are reformulated annually by updating the seed strains.

When the antigenicities of the seed strains and wild viruses do not match, vaccines fail to protect the vaccinees. In addition, even when they do match, escape mutants are often generated.

Drugs available for the treatment of influenza include Amantadine and Rimantadine, which inhibit the uncoating of virions by interfering with M2, and Oseltamivir (marketed under the brand name Tamiflu), Zanamivir, and Peramivir, which inhibit the release of virions from infected cells by interfering with NA. However, escape mutants are often generated for the former drug and less frequently for the latter drug.

See also 

 Influenza-like illness

References

Further reading

External links 

 Health-EU Portal: EU work to prepare a global response to influenza.
 Influenza Research Database: Database of influenza genomic sequences and related information.
 European Commission—Public Health: EU coordination on Pandemic (H1N1) 2009
 3D Influenza-virus-related structures from the EM Data Bank (EMDB)
 Viralzone: Orthomyxoviridae
 Virus Taxonomy: 2020 Release: International Committee on Taxonomy of Viruses (ICTV)

 
Virus families